= Neikarappatti =

- Village
- Location in Tamil Nadu, India
- Coordinates: 11°38′26″N 78°07′29″E
- Country: India
- State: Tamil Nadu
- District: Salem

Population (2001)
  - Total: 9,912

Languages
  - Official: Tamil
- Time zone: UTC+5:30 (IST)

Neikarappatti is a census town in Salem district in the Indian state of Tamil Nadu.

== Demographics ==
As of 2001 India census, Neikarappatti had a population of 9912. Males constitute 51% of the population and females 49%. Neikarappatti has an average literacy rate of 53%, lower than the national average of 59.5%: male literacy is 63%, and female literacy is 42%. In Neikarappatti, 12% of the population is under 6 years of age.
